Adventures in the Land of Music is the second album by the Los Angeles, California-based R&B group Dynasty, released in 1980. The title track was sampled by producer DJ Ski for Camp Lo's 1997 hit "Luchini AKA This Is It".

Track listing
 "I've Just Begun to Love You" 	(William Shelby, Ricky Smith)	6:26
 "Groove Control" (Nidra Beard, William Shelby,  Kevin Spencer) 	4:47
 "Take Another Look at Love" (Leon Sylvers III) 	4:21
 "Day and Night"" (Wardell Potts, William Shelby) 	5:59
 "Do Me Right" 	(Nidra Beard, William Shelby) 	6:04
 "Something to Remember" (Nidra Beard, Linda Carriere, Gene Dozier) 	4:38
 "Adventures in the Land of Music" (Leon Sylvers III, Richard Randolph, Ricky Smith, Kevin Spencer) 	4:14
 "Ice Breaker" 	(Leon Sylvers III) 	5:20

Personnel
 Kevin Spencer, Linda Carriere, Nidra Beard,  – Lead Vocals
 Leon Sylvers III – Bass
 William Shelby – Synthesizer, Lead Vocals
 Wardell Potts – Drums
 Ricky Smith – Synthesizer
 Ernest "Pepper" Reed, Richard Randolph– Guitar
 Gene Dozier, Joey Gallo, Kevin Spencer, Ricky Smith, William Shelby – Keyboards
 Harvey Mason, Kenny Hutson, Wayne Milstein – Percussion
 Dana Myers, Dynasty, Mark Philpart – Backing Vocals

Charts

Singles

Samples
 "Adventures in the Land of Music" was sampled by Camp Lo in the song "Luchini AKA This Is It" on their album, ''Uptown Saturday Night", by American R&B singer Brooke Valentine for her single "Long as You Come Home" from her debut album Chain Letter, and by Angie Stone in her song "Lovers Ghetto" on her album ″Stone Love″.

References

External links
 Dynasty-Adventures In The Land Of Music at Discogs

1980 albums
Dynasty (band) albums
SOLAR Records albums
Albums produced by Leon Sylvers III